The M.B. Lockett Building is an historic building at 119 West 7th Street in Georgetown, Texas, United States. It is part of the Williamson County Courthouse Historic District.

See also

 List of Recorded Texas Historic Landmarks (Trinity-Zavala)

References

External links
 

Buildings and structures in Georgetown, Texas